Rumen Leonidov (born 17 May 1953) is a Bulgarian poet, translator, journalist and publisher. He has published nine books and received numerous Bulgarian as well as international awards for poetry. He was born in Sofia and earned a degree in Bulgarian philology from Plovdiv University.

References

1953 births
Living people
Bulgarian poets
Bulgarian translators
Bulgarian journalists
Bulgarian publishers (people)
Bulgarian male poets